John Barker (born 1965) is an American entrepreneur and advertising executive based in New York City, NY. He is the founder of 3 companies: integrated advertising and interactive agency Barker/DZP; branded entertainment firm The ACME Brand Content Company, and multi-platform digital content production company Digital Zen Productions.

Early years

John grew up in St. Louis, MO and attended St. Louis Country Day School (since renamed MICDS).  From 1983-1987, he attended Yale University in New Haven, CT.  While at Yale, he was an editor of several literary publications, including Zirkus and the Yale Literary Review and was also the winner of a 1984 Academy of American Poets Prize.

Career

Following graduation from college, John was selected for the management training program of Ted Bates Advertising. In 1988, he joined Grey Entertainment as a copywriter, where he developed campaigns to launch ABC Television series such as thirtysomething, NYPD Blue, Roseanne, and China Beach, including the development of the “Who killed Laura Palmer?” campaign to launch David Lynch’s Twin Peaks.

From 1990-95, he served as Director of Advertising at Sony Music, managing advertising for Columbia, Epic, Def jam, and other Sony Music labels. John returned to Grey Entertainment in 1995 as SVP, Group Creative Director/Group Account Manager, overseeing ABC Television as well as the launch of The WB Network. In 1998, he moved to Grey Worldwide as SVP, Worldwide Branding Director and later, as Executive Vice President overseeing Hasbro, Globalstar and DoubleClick as well as the Grey Digital Business Group.

Barker/DZP

In 2003, John Barker founded DZP Marketing Communications, renamed Barker/DZP in 2007.  The agency was named one of the “Hot 100” new small businesses in America by Entrepreneur Magazine in 2005. As of 2010, the integrated advertising and interactive agency served clients such as Procter & Gamble, Estee Lauder,  The History Channel, Major League Soccer, Hastens Beds, Conjure Cognac and Boylan Bottling. The agency was listed by Advertising Age as having billings of over $30 Million in 2008. https://web.archive.org/web/20100411235900/http://www.digitalzen.net/

The ACME Brand Content Company

In addition to Barker/DZP, John Barker founded The ACME Brand Content Company in 2008, with David P. Caruso serving as President. As a branded content and branded entertainment company, ACME helped create TAG Records in conjunction with Procter & Gamble and Def Jam Records. In 2009, ACME was wholly acquired by United Entertainment Group, a division of United Talent Agency.

Digital Zen Productions

In April 2010, Barker launched a third company, Digital Zen Productions, a multi-platform digital content company. Ray Rainville serves as Managing Director and Executive Producer. Clients include LAB Series, GCG, Soccer United Marketing, Sean John’s “I Am King” fragrance, and AETN International.

References

External links
 Barker/DZP
 Digital Zen Productions
 BarkerDZP's Work on IHaveAnIdea.com
 BarkerDZP's Work on Flickr.com
 Barker/DZP Blog

1965 births
Living people
Businesspeople from New York City
American advertising executives